Josephine Chiwendu Chukwunonye (born 19 March 1992) is a Nigerian professional footballer who plays as a defender for Swedish Damallsvenskan club Kungsbacka DFF and the Nigeria women's national team. She previously played for Nigerian domestic side Rivers Angels for seven years, and for Washington Spirit in the National Women's Soccer League.

Club career
After seven years playing for Rivers Angels in the Nigerian Women's Championship, in June 2015 it was announced Chukwunonye was joining the National Women's Soccer League side Washington Spirit. She was signed at the same time as Australian international Hayley Raso, with the announcement coming the day before the Nigeria women's national football team played Australia in the 2015 FIFA Women's World Cup. Chukwunonye said at the time, "I am excited to join the Washington Spirit family; it's a thing of joy and a dream come true for me, I love playing with great players like Crystal Dunn, who I faced in the U20 World Cup in 2012. I am excited to work with coach Parsons because I know he will bring out the best in me." Chukwunonye was the second Nigerian international in the squad, joining Francisca Ordega. After playing two games for the team, she was released in December 2015.

In March 2016, both Chukwynonye and fellow Nigerian international Ngozi Okobi were signed by Swedish side Vittsjö GIK. They had previously played together in the squad of the Washington Spirit, and on their move to Vittsjö GIK, they joined with two further Nigerian internationals, Nkem Ezurike and Ifeoma Dieke. Chukwynonye said "I am excited to join the Vittsjo family; it's a thing of joy and a dream come true for me, I am eager to prove myself and give my very best to propel the club to glory".

International career
Chukwunonye has represented Nigeria on junior levels at the 2008 FIFA U-17 Women's World Cup and 2012 FIFA U-20 Women's World Cup. At senior level she was part of Nigeria's squads in the FIFA Women's World Cup tournaments of 2011 and 2015 as well as the African Women's Championship in the 2010, 2012 and 2014 editions, winning the tournament three times (2010 and 2014).and 2018 Africa women’s championship (winner)ref></ref>

Honours

International
 Nigeria
 African Women's Championship (2): 2010, 2014

Club
 Rivers Angels
 Nigerian Women's Championship (1): 2010
 Nigerian Women's Cup (5): 2010, 2011, 2012, 2013, 2014

References

External links
 
 

Rivers Angels F.C. players
1992 births
Living people
Nigeria women's international footballers
Women's association football defenders
2015 FIFA Women's World Cup players
Nigerian women's footballers
National Women's Soccer League players
Washington Spirit players
2011 FIFA Women's World Cup players
Vittsjö GIK players
Damallsvenskan players
Kungsbacka DFF players
Nigerian expatriate women's footballers
Nigerian expatriate sportspeople in the United States
Expatriate women's soccer players in the United States
Nigerian expatriate sportspeople in Sweden
Expatriate women's footballers in Sweden
Osun Babes F.C. players